Scott Langkow (born April 21, 1975) is a Canadian former professional ice hockey goaltender. He played 20 National Hockey League games and for numerous teams in the minor and European leagues, most notably for the Springfield Falcons of the American Hockey League and the Krefeld Pinguine of the Deutsche Eishockey Liga. Langkow was born in Sherwood Park, Alberta, but grew up in Edmonton, Alberta.

Playing career 
Langkow described his playing style as a combination of butterfly and stand-up.

Langkow played for the Portland Winter Hawks in the WHL and recorded three straight 20-win seasons with the club before being drafted by Winnipeg Jets with their 2nd pick, 31st overall, in the 1993 NHL Entry Draft. When the Winnipeg franchise relocated on July 1, 1996, he was transferred to the Phoenix Coyotes. During this time he won 63 games over three seasons and was one of the top goaltenders in the AHL while playing for the Springfield Falcons. In 1998 he won the Aldege "Baz" Bastien Memorial Award as AHL's best goaltender.

Langkow was traded to Atlanta Thrashers on June 25, 1999, where he played 15 games for the NHL club before being traded again to the Mighty Ducks with Sergei Vyshedkevich for Ladislav Kohn on February 9, 2001.

After four seasons playing for Ässät in the SM-liiga, Langkow signed a one-year contract with HV71 in Sweden's top hockey league Elitserien. After only having played 11 games as starting goalie for HV71 in the Swedish league, Langkow signed with the Swiss team Rapperswil-Jona Lakers in Nationalliga A. In June 2007 he signed a one-year contract with Jokerit of the Finnish SM-liiga.

Although Langkow was contracted to Jokerit his contract was terminated as he was replaced by Jussi Markkanen as the number 1 goaltender for Jokerit.

After playing a single season for Metallurg Novokuznetsk of the Russian league, Langkow signed with the Krefeld Pinguine in 2008, for whom he played as the starting goaltender for five seasons, retiring at the end of the 2013 season.

Off the ice 
Langkow is married with one daughter and two sons; Rylan, Beckett, and Calder. He is married to Anya. He has a younger brother named Daymond who had a 17-year NHL career. Langkow likes to go fishing and play golf in his spare time.

Awards 
 Named to the WHL West Second All-Star Team in 1994 and 1995.
 Awarded the Hap Holmes Memorial Award (AHL fewest goals against) in 1996. (Shared with Manny Legace)
 Named to the AHL First All-Star Team in 1998.
 Awarded the Aldege "Baz" Bastien Memorial Award (AHL Outstanding Goaltender) in 1998.

Career statistics

Regular season and playoffs

References

External links
 

1975 births
Living people
Ässät players
Atlanta Thrashers players
Canadian expatriate ice hockey players in Finland
Canadian expatriate ice hockey players in Germany
Canadian expatriate ice hockey players in Russia
Canadian expatriate ice hockey players in Sweden
Canadian ice hockey goaltenders
Cincinnati Mighty Ducks players
HV71 players
Jokerit players
Kalamazoo Wings (1974–2000) players
Krefeld Pinguine players
Las Vegas Thunder players
Lukko players
Metallurg Novokuznetsk players
Mobile Mysticks players
Orlando Solar Bears (IHL) players
Phoenix Coyotes players
Portland Winterhawks players
Ice hockey people from Edmonton
Sportspeople from Sherwood Park
Springfield Falcons players
Utah Grizzlies (AHL) players
Winnipeg Jets (1979–1996) draft picks
Winnipeg Jets (1979–1996) players
Canadian expatriate ice hockey players in the United States
Canadian expatriate ice hockey players in Switzerland